Tarkio Township is one of eleven townships in Atchison County, Missouri, United States. As of the 2010 census, its population was 1,752.

Tarkio Township was organized in 1845, and named after the nearby Tarkio River.

Geography
It contains one cemetery, Home.

The streams of Middle Tarkio Creek and West Tarkio Creek run through this township.

Transportation
Tarkio Township contains one airport, Gould Peterson Municipal Airport.

References

 USGS Geographic Names Information System (GNIS)

External links
 US-Counties.com
 City-Data.com

Townships in Atchison County, Missouri
Townships in Missouri